Sanqoz-e Bala (also Romanized as Sanqoz-e Bālā; also known as Sanqor-e Bālā) is a village in Miankuh Rural District, Chapeshlu District, Dargaz County, Razavi Khorasan Province, Iran. At the 2006 census, its population was 28, in 6 families.

References 

Populated places in Dargaz County